Samuel Emmett Horne Jr. (July 26, 1924 –February 4, 2006) was a research scientist at B. F. Goodrich noted for first synthesizing cis-1,4-polyisoprene, the main polymer contained in natural tree rubber, using Ziegler catalysis. Earlier attempts to produce synthetic rubber from isoprene had been unsuccessful, but in 1955, Horne prepared 98 percent cis-1,4-polyisoprene via the stereospecific polymerization of isoprene. The product of this reaction differs from natural rubber only slightly.  It contains a small amount of cis-1,2-polyisoprene, but it is indistinguishable from natural rubber in its physical properties.

The importance of Horne's development of synthetic polyisoprene and polybutadiene is readily seen in the production of these polymers. In 2008, global production of polybutadiene was 2,042,000 metric tons (exceeded only by SBR in capacity and production). Production of polyisoprene was 611,000 metric tons (Russia, 415,000; Asia, 78,000; US, 90,000; Europe, 25,000).

In 1980, the ACS Rubber Division honored Horne with the Charles Goodyear Medal. In 1982, he received an honorary doctorate from Emory University.

Personal

Horne was born July 26, 1924, in Jacksonville, Florida He grew up in Tampa, Florida. He married Sue Ross in 1949. They had four children.

He showed interest in chemistry at a young age.  When he was five or six years old, he and a friend played with a chemistry set. Although the experiments sometimes led to unpleasant odors and other problems, his parents nevertheless encouraged the young Horne to pursue his interest in chemistry.

Horne died on February 4, 2006, in Columbus, Ohio.

Education and career

Horne graduated from Tampa's Henry B. Plant High School in 1942. He enrolled at Emory University, but his university studies were interrupted by World War II. He joined the U.S. Navy in July 1943 and served until 1946. He was released to inactive status with the rank of Lieutenant (JG).

He returned to Emory University, where he obtained his A.B. degree in 1947, his M.A. degree in 1948, and his Ph.D. degree in 1950. While at Emory University, he taught organic chemistry from 1947 to 1950. He also had a research fellowship from 1946 to 1950. Horne's intention was to enter the teaching profession after completing his Ph.D. degree. He received advice to obtain industrial research experience before entering the academia. Taking that advice, he obtained a position at the B. F. Goodrich Company's Research and Development Center in Brecksville, Ohio in 1950. He was promoted in 1953, promoted again to Research Associate in 1960, and to Senior Research Associate in 1968.

In 1982, B. F. Goodrich changed its strategic direction and sold its synthetic rubber operations to Polysar, Ltd. Goodrich was deemphasizing rubber research.  As Horne's main interest was in rubber research, he made the decision to join Polysar. He retired from Polysar in 1987.

Research

Synthetic polyisoprene

In 1954, immediately following the formation of the joint venture Goodrich-Gulf Chemicals, Inc., an option agreement was obtained from Professor Karl Ziegler to examine his new catalyst system for the polymerization of ethylene.  Horne was called back from vacation to the Research Center to begin work immediately. He was given the assignment of translating into practice the information that B. F. Goodrich would receive from Karl Ziegler. After verifying the claims for the polymerization of ethylene, and also for other alpha-olefins, Horne copolymerized ethylene with other olefins as a means of controlling the polyethylene density. With the success of the copolymerizations, he decided to try to copolymerize ethylene with isoprene, with the thought of getting a copolymer that could be vulcanized with sulfur in a typical rubber recipe. While Professor Ziegler did not report the polymerization of dienes with his catalyst, Horne saw no reason why a copolymer or a homopolymer could not be made from a pure hydrocarbon diene. Actually, Karl Ziegler had said that they were unsuccessful in polymerizing dienes. With Horne's inquisitive nature and determination, he tried the copolymerization of ethylene and isoprene. Horne submitted the ethylene/isoprene copolymer for infrared examination. When Jim Shipman, who was responsible for the analysis, examined the infrared spectrum, he immediately called Horne and said, "Are you trying to fool us? We know natural rubber when we see it!"  Fractionation of the sample then showed a mixture of cis-1,4-polyisoprene and polyethylene. The fact that isoprene had polymerized was not unexpected, but the high degree of stereo control was unexpected. They immediately recognized the importance of this discovery and began an intense program to elucidate the chemistry and variables associated with diene polymerizations.

The successful duplication of natural rubber was a goal that had been sought by many scientists for nearly one hundred years. An extensive synthetic rubber program was carried out during World War II, one of the objectives being to accomplish this synthesis. The supply of natural rubber was limited for the military during World War II, because natural rubber plantations were not available to the allied forces due to the Japanese occupation of many of the world's rubber plantations.

With the process well defined, the scale-up of the process from 50-gram laboratory batches to ton-size production was started. In less than six months, they scaled the process to production-size quantities, made bus and truck tires, and ran them under service conditions on the highways. The test results showed conclusively that the synthetic cis-1,4-polyisoprene was essentially equivalent to natural rubber. During the factory trials, the research team was delighted when they heard the factory personnel comment during the rubber mixing trials that the experimental rubber was nothing new – it mixed just like natural rubber.

Polybutadiene
After he discovered the stereo control of polyisoprene, he discovered the polymerization and stereo control of butadiene as well as many other alkylbutadienes. The polymerization of butadiene can lead to three basic structures: the cis-1,4- and the trans-1,4-polybutadienes, and the 1,2-polybutadiene with a vinyl side group. From these three basic structures, there are five structurally different polymers: the cis and trans 1,4-polybutadienes, and the isotactic, syndiotactic, and atactic 1,2-polybutadienes. All of these polymers have been isolated in pure form.

Horne studied the Ziegler catalyst variables as well as other process variables and their effect on polybutadiene structures. He demonstrated that a wide variety of mixed cis and trans structures could be obtained by the proper choice of ratios of titanium tetrachloride to organo-aluminum. By replacing the titanium tetrachloride with titanium tetraiodide, he obtained polybutadiene with 90-95% cis-1,4-structures.

Catalysts based on cobalt salts were very useful for preparation of cis-1,4-polybutadienes. Although many cobalt salts were suitable, Horne used cobalt octoate. He showed that cobalt can function under heterogeneous or homogeneous conditions. He prepared at -78 °C a polybutadiene with 99.8% cis-1,4 structure, which was the highest percentage of cis-1,4 structure he had ever seen. He defined the effect of temperature, solvent, and other additives to the catalyst to produce the highest percentage of cis-1,4 polymer. He studied many other alkylbutadienes. He polymerized 2-ethyl, 2-propyl, 2-amyl, 2-t-butyl and 2,3-dimethyl butadiene as well as others.

Awards

In 1969, he was chairman of the Gordon Conference on Hydrocarbon Chemistry. In 1974, he received the Pioneer Award from the American Institute of Chemists. In 1978, he received the Midgley Medal from the Detroit Section of the American Chemical Society. In 1980, he received the Charles Goodyear Medal. And in 1982, he received an Honorary Doctor of Science from Emory University.

References

Polymer scientists and engineers
20th-century American chemists
1924 births
2006 deaths
Emory University alumni
United States Navy personnel of World War II